Henning Bager (born 18 February 1981) is a former motorcycle speedway rider from Denmark.

Biography
Bager was born in Esbjerg. Bager has competed in the UK since 1991, when he made his debut with Glasgow Tigers. He has since been part of several teams including Elite League Peterborough Panthers, Lakeside Hammers and Belle Vue Aces. In 2009 he broke his left leg in three places while riding for Panthers. He was fit again to ride in 2010 and appeared in seven meetings for Redcar Bears before being released after a poor run of form. He had a brief spell with Stoke Potters shortly afterwards. In August 2010 Bager was banned for the remainder of the season by the Danish authorities after being involved in a fight during a Danish league match. 

He returned to British racing in June 2011 when he was signed by Leicester Lions to replace Richard Sweetman, continuing to ride for the Lions for the rest of the season. In December 2011 he signed to ride for Coventry Bees in the 2012 Elite League season.
Henning rode for Berwick Bandits in the  Premier League before retiring.

References

1981 births
Living people
People from Esbjerg
Danish speedway riders
Glasgow Tigers riders
Peterborough Panthers riders
Isle of Wight Islanders riders
Lakeside Hammers riders
Birmingham Brummies riders
Berwick Bandits riders
Belle Vue Aces riders
Redcar Bears riders
Leicester Lions riders
Coventry Bees riders
Sportspeople from the Region of Southern Denmark